Cochylimorpha alticolana is a species of moth of the family Tortricidae. It is found in Xizang, China.

References

Moths described in 1964
Cochylimorpha
Taxa named by Józef Razowski
Moths of Asia